The 2004 Women's Hockey Asia Cup was the fifth edition of the Women's Hockey Asia Cup. It was held from 1 to 8 February 2004 at the Dhyan Chand National Stadium in New Delhi, India. The winner qualified for the 2006 World Cup.

India won the tournament for the first time by defeating Japan 1–0 in the final.

Teams

Officials
The following umpires were appointed by the International Hockey Federation to officiate the tournament:

 Khabaria Chandrakant (SGP)
 Corinne Cornelius (RSA)
 Ivonne Darling (SRI)
 Alison Hill (ENG)
 Emi Furuta (JPN)
 Nor Piza Hassan (MAS)
 Kang Hyung-Young (KOR)
 Happy Maan (IND)
 Radhasukumaran (IND)
 Mónica Rivera (ESP)

Results
All times are local (UTC+5:30)

Preliminary round

Pool A

Pool B

Classification round

Fifth to eighth place classification

Crossover

Seventh and eighth place

Fifth and sixth place

First to fourth place classification

Semi-finals

Third place game

Final

Final standings

See also
 2003 Men's Hockey Asia Cup

References

International women's field hockey competitions hosted by India
Women's Hockey Asia Cup
Asia Cup
Women's Hockey Asia Cup
Hockey Asia Cup
Sport in New Delhi